Winterfest is the name of several winter festivals held in various locations in North America.

Cedar Fair parks
WinterFest is a seasonal event held at Cedar Fair amusement parks, an event that enables the parks to remain open during the months of November and December. As of 2019, seven Cedar Fair parks have hosted WinterFest events, including California's Great America in Santa Clara, California; Canada's Wonderland in Vaughan, Ontario; Carowinds in Charlotte; King's Dominion in Doswell, Virginia; Kings Island in Mason, Ohio; and Worlds of Fun in Kansas City, Missouri. WinterFest events are typically themed with light displays, and includes seasonal foods, ice skating rinks, and performances by the Peanuts characters. Snowmaking machines are also used at these parks to create snow for the event.

Fort Lauderdale, Florida
The annual Winterfest in Fort Lauderdale, Florida, produces the Seminole Hard Rock Winterfest Boat Parade which is tagged the "Greatest Show on H2O" - founded in 1971, this annual boat parade and festival has earned the title, "The World's Most Watched Boat Parade." Celebrity grand marshals and 100 decorated boats entertain 1 million spectators along the 12-mile waterway parade route in December.

Lowell, Massachusetts
The annual Winterfest in Lowell, Massachusetts, is a festival that started in 2001. The two-day festival is held following Super Bowl week in downtown Lowell. Events include the Human Dog Sled Competition, in which six-person teams dressed in wacky costumes compete for titles ranging from fastest team to best dressed. The Human Dog Sled Competition was recognized by People for the Ethical Treatment of Animals (PETA) in 2003 for its animal-friendly approach to winter fun. In the Soup Bowl Competition, local restaurant chefs create original recipes that are rated by festival attendees.

Other Winterfest activities include children's entertainment, hot food, drink, live music, free ice skating at Tsongas Arena, a hay ride, a snowman building contest, and an art show of works by local artists. Musical performers have included the Joshua Tree. The festival ends with a fireworks display that organizers claim rivals those on the Fourth of July.

Beloit, Wisconsin
Similar to Lowell, Massachusetts', Winterfest, the Beloit festival ranges in location from the Eclipse Center to Riverside Park and downtown.  Events include an indoor playland, ice skating on the lagoon, ice sculpting and toboggan races.  All events take place in the city of Beloit.

Wausau, Wisconsin
The annual Winter Fest in Wausau, Wisconsin, is a festival that was founded in 2012 by Wausau Events, Inc. Activities for all ages are offered at sites throughout downtown Wausau and typically include horse-drawn wagon rides, art projects, cookie decorating, a snow sculptures, ice skating, and more.

Gatlinburg, Tennessee
A festival in Gatlinburg, Tennessee, this Winterfest takes place from Friday, February 18 - Sunday, February 20.  Unlike the other Winterfests, this one is mainly based around Christian fundamentals, as several churches come to the city and have three  – 3 hour worship sessions on Friday night, Saturday afternoon, and Sunday morning.  Usually, entertainment such as magicians or comedians will be brought in; besides the gatherings, visitors have periods of time for relaxation and recreation when they may go to places such as restaurants, arcades, and other fun activities.

Newaygo, Michigan
The annual Winterfest in Newaygo, is a backyard wrestling event started in 2002 as an annual major event put on by the Newaygo Wrestling Organization (nWo). Since its 2002 inception, the nWo has put on five more events, with the most recent in January 2011.

Coventry, Rhode Island
The annual Winterfest in Coventry, Rhode Island, is a bacchanalian celebration of the oppressive cold of New England winters.  It is intended to bring the arrival of spring through drink and food.

Philadelphia, Pennsylvania
Winterfest in Philadelphia is at the Blue Cross RiverRink, a skating rink and outdoor event facility located at Penn's Landing. During the winter months it hosts the Blue Cross RiverRink WinterFest, featuring winter-themed decorations, fire pits, and an outdoor beer garden. The first Winterfest was held in 2013, conceived by Avram Hornik of FCM Hospitality, who also owns the neighboring outdoor waterfront restaurant, Morgan's Pier. During the summer months, the ice rink is converted into a roller skating rink under the name SummerFest.

See also 
 Winterval - a controversial season of public events organised by the city council of Birmingham in 1997 and 1998
 Winterlude - a winter festival held annually in the Canadian National Capital Region
 Winter Formal - a high school event similar to prom

References

External links
Greater Merrimack Valley Convention and Visitors Bureau - Winterfest 2005
Lowell Winterfest
Kansas City Public Library
nWo Winterfest V
Wausau Winter Fest

Festivals in Massachusetts
Tourist attractions in Lowell, Massachusetts
Festivals in Florida
Tourist attractions in Fort Lauderdale, Florida
Festivals in Michigan
Tourist attractions in Newaygo County, Michigan
Festivals in Wisconsin
Tourist attractions in Rock County, Wisconsin
Tourist attractions in Marathon County, Wisconsin
Beloit, Wisconsin
Winter festivals in the United States